Hoxne was a hundred of Suffolk, with an area of .

Hoxne Hundred was a fertile district averaging about nine miles (14 km) in length and breadth. It was bounded on the north by the River Waveney which separates it from Norfolk, on the east by Wangford and Blything Hundreds, on the south by Plomesgate, Loes and Thredling Hundreds and on the west by Hartismere Hundred. The parishes of Carlton and Kelsale form a detached region to the south east of the hundred.

The area is watered by several streams flowing northward to the Waveney. On its southern side are the sources of the River Alde and near Laxfield the principal source of the River Blythe. The soil is primarily loam. The only town of any size is Stradbroke. It falls into the Deanery of Hoxne, the Archdeaconry of Suffolk, and the Diocese of Norwich.

Listed as Hoxana in the Domesday Book, the hundred owes its name to the village of Hoxne, site of St Edmund's martyrdom, which in turn means "settlement of the Hoxan", believed to be a small Saxon tribe. Other information indicates that at the time of the Domesday Book, in 1086, Hoxne Hundred was known as Bishop's Hundred.

Parishes

Hoxne Hundred was made up of the following 26 parishes:

References

Hundreds of Suffolk